Mike Nash (born 1965 in Limerick, Ireland) is a retired Irish sportsperson.  He played hurling with his local club South Liberties and was a member of the Limerick senior inter-county team in the 1990s.

References

1965 births
Living people
South Liberties hurlers
Limerick inter-county hurlers
Munster inter-provincial hurlers